The list of cloud types groups all cloud genera as high (cirro-, cirrus), middle (alto-), multi-level (nimbo-, cumulo-, cumulus), and low (strato-, stratus). These groupings are determined by the altitude level or levels in the troposphere at which each of the various cloud types is normally found. Small cumulus are commonly grouped with the low clouds because they do not show significant vertical extent. Of the multi-level genus-types, those with the greatest convective activity are often grouped separately as towering vertical. The genus types all have Latin names.

The genera are also grouped into five physical forms. These are, in approximate ascending order of instability or convective activity: stratiform sheets; cirriform wisps and patches; stratocumuliform patches, rolls, and ripples; cumuliform heaps, and cumulonimbiform towers that often have complex structures. Most genera are divided into species with Latin names, some of which are common to more than one genus. Most genera and species can be subdivided into varieties, also with Latin names, some of which are common to more than one genus or species. The essentials of the modern nomenclature system for tropospheric clouds were proposed by Luke Howard, a British manufacturing chemist and an amateur meteorologist with broad interests in science, in an 1802  presentation to the Askesian Society. Very low stratiform clouds that touch the Earth's surface are given the common names fog and mist, which are not included with the Latin nomenclature of clouds that form aloft in the troposphere.

Above the troposphere, stratospheric and mesospheric clouds have their own classifications with common names for the major types and alpha-numeric nomenclature for the subtypes. They are characterized by altitude as very high level (polar stratospheric) and extreme level (polar mesospheric). Three of the five physical forms in the troposphere are also seen at these higher levels, stratiform, cirriform, and stratocumuliform, although the tops of very large cumulonimbiform clouds can penetrate the lower stratosphere.

Cloud identification and classification: Order of listed types
In section two of this page (Classification of major types), height ranges are sorted in approximate descending order of altitude expressed in general terms. On the cross-classification table, forms and genus types (including some genus sub-types) are shown from left to right in approximate ascending order of instability.

In sections three to five, terrestrial clouds are listed in descending order of the altitude range of each atmospheric layer in which clouds can form:
 mesospheric layer;
 stratospheric layer;
 tropospheric layer.
 Within the troposphere, the cloud levels are listed in descending order of altitude range.
 Non-vertical genus types (including some genus sub-types) are sorted into approximate descending order of altitude of the cloud bases.
 Vertical or multi-level genera and genus sub-types can be based in the low or middle levels and are therefore placed between the non-vertical low and mid-level genus types and sub-types.  These thick clouds are listed in approximate descending order of altitude of the cloud tops.
 The species associated with each genus type are listed in approximate ascending order of instability where applicable.
 The constituent varieties and associated supplementary features and mother clouds for each genus or species are arranged in approximate order of frequency of occurrence.
A count of basic tropospheric variants that result from the division and subdivision of genus types into species and varieties is shown as a number in parentheses from V-1 (variant 1) through V-92 after each variety, after nimbostratus that has no sub-types, and after certain species that are not always dividable into varieties.

In section six, the cloud types in the general lists and the mother clouds in the applicable classification table are sorted in alphabetical order except where noted.  The species table shows these types sorted from left to right in approximate ascending order of the convective instability of each species.  The table for supplementary features has them arranged in approximate descending order of frequency of occurrence.

In section seven, extraterrestrial clouds can be found in the atmospheres of other planets in our solar system and beyond.  The planets with clouds are listed (not numbered) in order of their distance from the sun, and the clouds on each planet are in approximate descending order of altitude.

Cloud cross-classification throughout the homosphere

The table that follows is very broad in scope much like the cloud genera template near the bottom of the article and upon which this table is partly based. There are some variations in styles of nomenclature between the classification scheme used for the troposphere (strict Latin except for surface based aerosols) and the higher levels of the homosphere (common terms, some informally derived from Latin). However, the schemes presented here share a cross-classification of physical forms and altitude levels to derive the 10 tropospheric genera, the fog and mist that forms at surface level, and several additional major types above the troposphere. The cumulus genus includes four species that indicate vertical size which can affect the altitude levels.

Mesospheric cloud identification and classification
Clouds that form in the mesosphere come in a variety of forms such as veils, bands, and billows, but are not given Latin names based on these characteristics.  These clouds are the highest in the atmosphere and are given the Latin-derived name noctilucent which refers to their illumination during deep twilight rather than their physical forms. They are sub-classified alpha-numerically and with common terms according to specific details of their physical structures.

Extreme-level stratiform, stratocumuliform, and cirriform

Type 1  Veils, very tenuous stratiform; resembles cirrostratus or poorly defined cirrus.
Type 2  Long stratocumuliform bands, often in parallel groups or interwoven at small angles. More widely spaced than cirrocumulus bands.
2A  Bands with diffuse, blurred edges.
2B  Bands with sharply defined edges.
Type 3 Billows. Clearly spaced, fibrous cirriform, roughly parallel short streaks.
3A  Short, straight, narrow streaks.
3B  Wave-like structures with undulations.
Type 4  Whirls. Partial (or, more rarely, complete) cirriform rings with dark centers.
4A  Whirls possessing a small angular radius of curvature, sometimes resembling light ripples on a water surface.
4B  Simple curve of medium angular radius with one or more streaks.
4C  Whirls with large-scale ring structures.

Stratospheric cloud identification and classification

Polar stratospheric clouds form at very high altitudes in polar regions of the stratosphere. Those that show mother-of-pearl colors are given the name nacreous.

Very high-level stratiform
Nitric acid and water polar stratospheric   Sometimes known as type 1, a thin sheet-like cloud resembling cirrostratus or haze. Contains supercooled nitric acid and water droplets; sometimes also contains supercooled sulfuric acid in ternary solution.

Very high-level cirriform and stratocumuliform
Consists of ice crystals only.

Troposphere cloud identification and classification

Tropospheric clouds are divided into physical forms defined by structure, and levels defined by altitude range.  These divisions are cross-classified to produce ten basic genus-types. They have Latin names as authorized by the World Meteorological Organization (WMO) that indicate physical structure, altitude or étage, and process of formation.

High-level cirriform, stratocumuliform, and stratiform
High clouds form in the highest and coldest region of the troposphere from about 5 to 12 km (16,500 to 40,000 ft) in temperate latitudes. At this altitude water almost always freezes so high clouds are generally composed of ice crystals or supercooled water droplets.

Genus cirrus

Abbreviation: Ci

Cirriform clouds tend to be wispy and are mostly transparent or translucent. Isolated cirrus do not bring rain; however, large amounts of cirrus can indicate an approaching storm system eventually followed by fair weather.

There are several variations of clouds of the cirrus genus based on species and varieties:

Species

 Cirrus fibratus (V-1) High clouds having the traditional "mare's tail" appearance. These clouds are long, fibrous, and curved, with no tufts or curls at the ends.
 Cirrus uncinus (V-2) Filaments with up-turned hooks or curls.
 Cirrus spissatus (V-3) Dense and opaque or mostly opaque patches.
 Cirrus castellanus (V-4) A series of dense lumps, or "towers", connected by a thinner base.
 Cirrus floccus (V-5) Elements which take on a rounded appearance on the top, with the lower part appearing ragged.

Varieties
 Opacity-based None; always translucent except species spissatus which is inherently opaque.
 Fibratus pattern-based
 Cirrus fibratus intortus (V-6) Irregularly curved or tangled filaments.
 Cirrus fibratus vertebratus (V-7) Elements arranged in the manner of a vertebrate or fish skeleton.
 Pattern-based variety radiatus Large horizontal bands that appear to converge at the horizon; normally associated with fibratus and uncinus species.
 Cirrus fibratus radiatus (V-8)
 Cirrus uncinus radiatus (V-9)
 Pattern-based variety duplicatus Sheets at different layers of the upper troposphere, which may be connected at one or more points; normally associated with fibratus and uncinus species.
 Cirrus fibratus duplicatus (V-10)
 Cirrus uncinus duplicatus (V-11)
 Spissatus, castellanus, or floccus Varieties are not commonly associated.

Supplementary features
 Precipitation-based Not associated with cirrus.
 Cloud-based
 Mamma Bubble-like downward protuberances; mostly seen with species castellanus.

 Genitus mother clouds
 Cirrus cirrocumulogenitus
 Cirrus altocumulogenitus
 Cirrus cumulonimbogenitus
 Cirrus homogenitus Cirrus formed by spreading of aircraft contrails.

 Mutatus mother cloud
 Cirrus cirrostratomutatus
 Cirrus homomutatus Cirrus formed by the complete transformation of cirrus homogenitus.

Genus cirrocumulus

Abbreviation: Cc.

High-level stratocumuliform clouds of the genus cirrocumulus form when moist air at high tropospheric altitude reaches saturation, creating ice crystals or supercooled water droplets. Limited convective instability at the cloud level gives the cloud a rolled or rippled appearance. Despite the lack of a strato- prefix, layered cirrocumulus is physically a high stratocumuliform genus.

High stratocumuliform species
 Cirrocumulus stratiformis (V-12) Sheets or relatively flat patches of cirrocumulus.
 Cirrocumulus lenticularis (V-13) Lenticular, or lens-shaped high cloud.
 Cirrocumulus castellanus (V-14) Cirrocumulus layer with "towers", or turrets joined at the bases.
 Cirrocumulus floccus (V-15) Very small white heaps with ragged bases and rounded tops.

Varieties
 Opacity-based varieties None (always translucent).
 Pattern-based varieties
 Undulatus Cirrocumulus with an undulating base; normally associated with stratiformis and lenticularis species.
 Stratocumuliform undulatus (V-16)
 Cirrocumulus stratiformis undulatus (V-17)
 Cirrocumulus lenticularis undulatus (V-18)
 Lacunosus Cirrocumulus with large clear holes; normally associated with stratiformis and castellanus species (also with cumuliform floccus species).
 Stratocumuliform lacunosus
 Cirrocumulus stratiformis lacunosus (V-19)
 Cirrocumulus castellanus lacunosus (V-20)
 Cirrocumulus floccus lacunosus (V-21)

Supplementary features
 Precipitation-based supplementary feature
 Virga Light precipitation that evaporates well above ground level; mostly seen with species stratiformis, castellanus, and floccus.
 Cloud-based supplementary feature
 Mamma Bubble-like downward protuberances; mostly seen with species castellanus.
 Genitus mother clouds No genitus types.
 Mutatus mother clouds
 Cirrocumulus cirromutatus
 Cirrocumulus cirrostratomutatus
 Cirrocumulus altocumulomutatus
 Cirrocumulus homomutatus Results from the transformation of cirrus homogenitus.

Genus cirrostratus

Abbreviation: Cs

Clouds of the genus cirrostratus consist of mostly continuous, wide sheets of cloud that covers a large area of the sky. It is formed when convectively stable moist air cools to saturation at high altitude, forming ice crystals. Frontal cirrostratus is a precursor to rain or snow if it thickens into mid-level altostratus and eventually nimbostratus, as the weather front moves closer to the observer.

Species
 Cirrostratus fibratus (V-22) Cirrostratus sheet with a fibrous appearance, but not as detached as cirrus.
 Cirrostratus nebulosus (V-23) Featureless, uniform sheet.

Varieties
 Opacity-based varieties None (always translucent)
 Fibratus pattern-based varieties
 Cirrostratus fibratus duplicatus (V-24) Separate or semi-merged sheets with one layer slightly above the other.
 Cirrostratus fibratus undulatus (V-25) Undulating waves.
 Varieties are not commonly associated with Cs species nebulosus.

Supplementary features
 Supplementary features/accessory clouds: Not associated with cirrostratus.
 Genitus mother clouds
 Cirrostratus cirrocumulogenitus
 Cirrostratus cumulonimbogenitus
 Mutatus mother clouds
 Cirrostratus cirromutatus
 Cirrostratus cirrocumulomutatus
 Cirrostratus altostratomutatus
 Cirrostratus homomutatus Results from the transformation of cirrus homogenitus.

Mid-level stratocumuliform and stratiform
Middle cloud forms from 2 to 7 km (6,500–23,000 ft) in temperate latitudes, and may be composed of water droplets or ice crystals depending on the temperature profile at that altitude range.

Genus altocumulus

Abbreviation: Ac

Mid-level stratocumuliform clouds of the genus altocumulus are not always associated with a weather front but can still bring precipitation, usually in the form of virga which does not reach the ground. Layered forms of altocumulus are generally an indicator of limited convective instability, and are therefore mainly stratocumuliform in structure.

Mid-level stratocumuliform species
 Altocumulus stratiformis Always dividable into opacity-based varieties. Sheets or relatively flat patches of altocumulus.
 Altocumulus lenticularis (V-26) Lens-shaped middle cloud. Includes informal variant altocumulus Kelvin–Helmholtz cloud, lenticular spiral indicative of severe turbulence.
 Altocumulus volutus (V-27) Elongated, tube shaped, horizontal stratocumuliform cloud.
 Altocumulus castellanus (V-28) Turreted layer cloud.
 Altocumulus floccus (V-29) Tufted stratocumuliform clouds with ragged bases.

Varieties
 Opacity-based varieties
 Altocumulus stratiformis translucidus (V-30) Translucent altocumulus through which the sun or moon can be seen.
 Altocumulus stratiformis perlucidus (V-31) Opaque middle clouds with translucent breaks.
 Altocumulus stratiformis opacus (V-32) Opaque altocumulus that obscures the sun or moon.
 Pattern-based varieties
 Radiatus Rows of altocumulus that appear to converge at the horizon;  normally associated with stratiformis species.
 Altocumulus stratiformis translucidus radiatus (V-33)
 Altocumulus stratiformis perlucidus radiatus (V-34)
 Altocumulus stratiformis opacus radiatus (V-35)
 Duplicatus Altocumulus in closely spaced layers, one above the other; normally associated with stratiformis and lenticularis species.
 Altocumulus stratiformis translucidus duplicatus (V-36)
 Altocumulus stratiformis perlucidus duplicatus (V-37)
 Altocumulus stratiformis opacus duplicatus (V-38)
 Altocumulus lenticularis duplicatus (V-39)
 Undulatus Altocumulus with wavy undulating base; normally associated with stratiformis and lenticularis species.
 Altocumulus stratiformis translucidus undulatus (V-40)
 Altocumulus stratiformis perlucidus undulatus (V-41)
 Altocumulus stratiformis opacus undulatus (V-42)
 Altocumulus lenticularis undulatus (V-43)
 Lacunosus Altocumulus with circular holes caused by localized downdrafts; normally associated with stratiformis and castellanus species (also with cumuliform floccus species).
 Altocumulus stratiformis translucidus lacunosus (V-44)
 Altocumulus stratiformis perlucidus lacunosus (V-45)
 Altocumulus stratiformis opacus lacunosus (V-46)
 Altocumulus castellanus lacunosus (V-47)
 Altocumulus floccus lacunosus (V-48)

Supplementary features
 Precipitation-based supplementary feature
 Virga Altocumulus producing precipitation that evaporates before reaching the ground; usually associated with species stratiformis, castellanus, and floccus.
 Cloud-based supplementary feature
 Mamma Altocumulus (usually species castellanus) with downward facing bubble-like protuberances caused by localized downdrafts within the cloud.
 Genitus mother clouds
 Altocumulus cumulogenitus
 Altocumulus cumulonimbogenitus
 Mutatus mother clouds
 Altocumulus cirrocumulomutatus
 Altocumulus altostratomutatus
 Altocumulus nimbostratomutatus
 Altocumulus stratocumulomutatus

Genus altostratus

Abbreviation: As

Stratiform clouds of the genus altostratus form when a large convectively stable airmass is lifted to condensation in the middle level of the troposphere, usually along a frontal system. Altostratus can bring light rain or snow. If the precipitation becomes continuous, it may thicken into nimbostratus which can bring precipitation of moderate to heavy intensity.

Species
No differentiated species (always nebulous).

Varieties
 Opacity-based varieties
 Altostratus translucidus (V-49) Altostratus through which the sun can be seen.
 Altostratus opacus (V-50) Altostratus that completely blocks out the sun.
 Pattern-based variety radiatus Bands that appear to converge at the horizon.
 Altostratus translucidus radiatus (V-51)
 Altostratus opacus radiatus (V-52)
 Pattern-based variety duplicatus Altostratus in closely spaced layers, one above the other.
 Altostratus translucidus duplicatus (V-53)
 Altostratus opacus duplicatus (V-54)
 Pattern-based variety undulatus Altostratus with wavy undulating base.
 Altostratus translucidus undulatus (V-55)
 Altostratus opacus undulatus (V-56)

Supplementary features
 Precipitation-based supplementary features
 Virga Accompanied by precipitation that evaporates before reaching the ground. Seen mostly with opacus varieties.
 Praecipitatio Produces precipitation that reaches the ground; associated with opacus varieties.
 Cloud-based supplementary feature
 Mamma Altostratus with downward facing bubble-like protuberances caused by localized downdrafts within the cloud.
 Accessory cloud Seen mostly with opacus varieties
 Pannus Accompanied by ragged lower layer of fractus species clouds forming in precipitation.
 Genitus mother clouds
 Altostratus altocumulogenitus
 Altostratus cumulonimbogenitus
 Mutatus mother clouds
 Altostratus cirrostratomutatus
 Altostratus nimbostratomutatus

Towering vertical cumulonimbiform and cumuliform (low to mid-level cloud base)

Genus cumulonimbus: Towering vertical

Abbreviation: Cb

Clouds of the genus cumulonimbus have very-dark-gray-to-nearly-black flat bases and very high tops that can penetrate the tropopause. They develop from cumulus when the airmass is convectively highly unstable. They generally produce thunderstorms, rain or showers, and sometimes hail, strong outflow winds, and/or tornadoes at ground level.

Species
 Cumulonimbus calvus (V-57) Cumulonimbus with high domed top.
 Cumulonimbus capillatus (V-58) Towering vertical cloud with high cirriform top.

Varieties
No varieties (always opaque and does not form in patterns visible from surface level).

Supplementary features
 Precipitation-based supplementary features Associated with calvus and capillatus species.
 Virga Precipitation that evaporates before reaching the ground.
 Praecipitatio Precipitation that reaches the ground.
 Cloud-based supplementary features
 Incus (species capillatus only) Cumulonimbus with flat anvil-like cirriform top caused by wind shear where the rising air currents hit the inversion layer at the tropopause.
 Mamma Also sometimes called Mammatus, consisting of bubble-like protrusions on the underside caused by localized downdrafts.
 Arcus (including roll and shelf clouds) Low, horizontal cloud formation associated with the leading edge of thunderstorm outflow.
 Tuba Column hanging from the cloud base which can develop into a funnel cloud or tornado.
 Accessory clouds Seen with species and capillatus except where noted. 
 Pannus Accompanied by a lower layer of fractus species cloud forming in precipitation. 
 Pileus (species calvus only) Small cap-like cloud over parent cumulonimbus.
 Velum A thin horizontal sheet that forms around the middle of a cumulonimbus.
 Genitus mother clouds
 Cumulonimbus altocumulogenitus
 Cumulonimbus altostratogenitus
 Cumulonimbus nimbostratogenitus
 Cumulonimbus stratocumulogenitus
 Cumulonimbus flammagenitus Formed by large-scale fires or volcanic eruptions.
 Mutatus mother cloud
 Cumulonimbus cumulomutatus

Genus cumulus: Towering vertical

Abbreviations: Cu con (cumulus congestus) or Tcu (towering cumulus)

Species
 Cumulus congestus (V-59) These large cumulus clouds have flat dark grey bases and very tall tower-like formations with tops mostly in the high level of the troposphere. The International Civil Aviation Organization (ICAO) designates this species as towering cumulus (Tcu).

Varieties
 Opacity-based varieties None (always opaque).
 Pattern-based variety None (not generally discerned with highly unstable cumulus congestus).

Supplementary features
 Precipitation-based supplementary features
 Virga Accompanied by precipitation that evaporates before reaching the ground.
 Praecipitatio Produces precipitation that reaches the ground.
 Cloud-based supplementary features
 Mamma Downward facing bubble-like protuberances caused by localized downdrafts within the cloud.
 Arcus (including roll and shelf clouds) Low horizontal cloud formation associated with the leading edge of a thunderstorm outflow.
 Tuba Column hanging from the cloud base which can develop into a small funnel cloud.
 Accessory clouds
 Pannus Accompanied by a lower layer of fractus species cloud forming in precipitation. 
 Pileus Small cap-like cloud over parent cumulus cloud.
 Velum A thin horizontal sheet that forms around the middle of a cumulus cloud.
 Mother clouds
 Cumulus congestus flammagenitus
 Other genitus and mutatus types are the same as for small and moderate cumulus.

Multi-level stratiform and moderate vertical cumuliform (low to mid-level cloud base)

Genus nimbostratus: Multi-level

Abbreviation: Ns (V-60)

Clouds of the genus nimbostratus tend to bring constant precipitation and low visibility. This cloud type normally forms above  from altostratus cloud but tends to thicken into the lower levels during the occurrence of precipitation. The top of a nimbostratus deck is usually in the middle level of the troposphere.

Species
No differentiated species (always nebulous).

Varieties
No varieties (always opaque and never forms in patterns).

Supplementary features
 Precipitation-based supplementary features
 Virga Accompanied by precipitation that evaporates before reaching the ground.
 Praecipitatio Produces precipitation that reaches the ground.
 Accessory cloud
 Pannus Nimbostratus with lower layer of fractus species cloud forming in precipitation.
 Genitus mother clouds
 Nimbostratus cumulogenitus
 Nimbostratus cumulonimbogenitus
 Mutatus mother clouds
 Nimbostratus altostratomutatus
 Nimbostratus altocumulomutatus
 Nimbostratus stratocumulomutatus

Genus cumulus: Moderate vertical

Abbreviation: Cu

Moderate vertical cumulus is the product of free convective airmass instability. Continued upward growth suggests showers later in the day.

Species
 Cumulus mediocris (V-61) Moderate vertical clouds with flat medium grey bases and higher tops than cumulus humilis.

Varieties
 Opacity-based varieties: None (always opaque)
 Pattern-based variety
 Cumulus mediocris radiatus (V-62)(V-60); Moderate cumulus clouds arranged in parallel lines that appear to converge at the horizon.

Supplementary features
 Precipitation-based supplementary features:
 Virga Accompanied by precipitation that evaporates before reaching the ground.
 Praecipitatio Produces precipitation that reaches the ground.
 Cloud-based supplementary feature
 Mamma Downward facing bubble-like protuberances caused by localized downdrafts within the cloud.
 Accessory clouds
 Pileus; Small cap-like cloud over parent cumulus cloud.
 Velum A thin horizontal sheet that forms around the middle of a cumulus cloud.
 Mother clouds Genitus and mutatus types are the same as for cumulus of little vertical extent.

Low-level stratocumuliform, cumuliform, and stratiform
Low cloud forms from near surface to ca.  and are generally composed of water droplets.

Genus stratocumulus

Abbreviation: Sc

Clouds of the genus stratocumulus are lumpy, often forming in slightly unstable air, and they can produce very light rain or drizzle.

Species
 Stratocumulus stratiformis Always dividable into opacity-based varieties. Sheets or relatively flat patches of stratocumulus
 Stratocumulus lenticularis (V-63) Lens-shaped low cloud.
 Stratocumulus volutus  (V-64) Elongated, low-level, tube shaped, horizontal stratocumuliform cloud.
 Stratocumulus floccus (V-65) Scattered or isolated stratocumulus tufts with domed tops and ragged bases.
 Stratocumulus castellanus (V-66) Layer of turreted stratocumulus cloud with tower-like formations protruding upwards.

Varieties
 Stratocumuliform opacity-based varieties
 Stratocumulus stratiformis translucidus (V-67) Thin translucent stratocumulus through which the sun or moon can be seen.
 Stratocumulus stratiformis perlucidus (V-68) Opaque low clouds with translucent breaks.
 Stratocumulus stratiformis opacus (V-69) Opaque stratocumulus clouds.
 Pattern-based variety radiatus Stratocumulus arranged in parallel bands that appear to converge on the horizon; normally associated with stratiformis species.
 Stratocumulus stratiformis translucidus radiatus (V-70)
 Stratocumulus stratiformis perlucidus radiatus (V-71)
 Stratocumulus stratiformis opacus radiatus (V-72)
 Pattern-based variety duplicatus Closely spaced layers of stratocumulus, one above the other; normally associated with stratiformis and lenticularis species.
 Stratocumulus stratiformis translucidus duplicatus (V-73)
 Stratocumulus stratiformis perlucidus duplicatus (V-74)
 Stratocumulus stratiformis opacus duplicatus (V-75)
 Stratocumulus lenticularis duplicatus (V-76)
 Pattern-based variety undulatus Stratocumulus with wavy undulating base; normally associated with stratiformis and lenticularis species.
 Stratocumulus stratiformis translucidus undulatus (V-77)
 Stratocumulus stratiformis perlucidus undulatus (V-78)
 Stratocumulus stratiformis opacus undulatus (V-79)
 Stratocumulus lenticularis undulatus (V-80)
 Pattern-based variety lacunosus Sc with circular holes caused by localized downdrafts; normally associated with stratiformis and castellanus species.
 Stratocumulus stratiformis translucidus lacunosus (V-81)
 Stratocumulus stratiformis perlucidus lacunosus (V-82)
 Stratocumulus stratiformis opacus lacunosus (V-83)
 Stratocumulus castellanus lacunosus (V-84)
 Stratocumulus floccus lacunosus (V-85)

Supplementary features
 Precipitation-based supplementary features Usually associated with species stratiformis and castellanus.
 Virga Low cloud producing precipitation that evaporates before reaching the ground.
 Praecipitatio Stratocumulus clouds producing precipitation that reaches the ground.
 Cloud-based supplementary feature
 Mamma Stratocumulus with bubble-like protrusions on the underside; usually associated with species castellanus.
 Genitus mother clouds
 Stratocumulus cumulogenitus
 Stratocumulus nimbostratogenitus
 Stratocumulus cumulonimbogenitus
 Stratocumulus altostratogenitus
 Mutatus mother clouds
 Stratocumulus nimbostratomutatus
 Stratocumulus altocumulomutatus
 Stratocumulus stratomutatus

Genus cumulus (little vertical extent)

Abbreviation: Cu

These are fair weather cumuliform clouds of limited convection that do not grow vertically. The vertical height from base to top is generally less than the width of the cloud base. They appear similar to stratocumulus but the elements are generally more detached and less wide at the base.

Species
 Cumulus fractus (V-86) Ragged shreds of cumulus clouds.
 Cumulus humilis (V-87) "Fair weather clouds" with flat light grey bases and small white domed tops.

Varieties
 Opacity-based varieties None (always opaque except species fractus which is always translucent).
 Humilis pattern-based variety
 Cumulus humilis radiatus (V-88) Small cumulus clouds arranged in parallel lines that appear to converge at the horizon.

Supplementary features and accessory clouds
Not commonly seen with cumulus fractus or humilis.
 Genitus mother clouds
 Cumulus stratocumulogenitus
 Cumulus homogenitus Clouds formed by air-mass convection associated with contained industrial activity.
 Mutatus mother clouds
 Cumulus stratocumulomutatus
 Cumulus stratomutatus
 Cumulus cataractagenitus Generated by the spray from waterfalls.

Genus stratus

Abbreviation: St

Clouds of the genus stratus form in low horizontal layers having a ragged or uniform base. Ragged stratus often forms in precipitation while more uniform stratus forms in maritime or other moist stable air mass conditions. The latter often produces drizzle.  Stratus that touches the Earth's surface is given the common name, fog, rather than a Latin name that applies only to clouds that form and remain aloft in the troposphere.

Species
 Stratus nebulosus Uniform fog-like low cloud.
 Stratus fractus (V-89) Ragged shreds of stratus clouds usually under base of precipitation clouds.

Varieties
 Nebulosus opacity-based varieties
 Stratus nebulosus translucidus (V-90) Thin translucent stratus.
 Stratus nebulosus opacus (V-91) Opaque stratus that obscures the sun or moon.
 Pattern-based variety undulatus Wavy undulating base.
 Stratus nebulosus translucidus undulatus (V-92)
 Stratus nebulosus opacus undulatus (V-93)
 Varieties are not commonly associated with St species fractus.

Supplementary features
 Precipitation-based supplementary feature
 Praecipitatio Stratus (usually species nebulosus) producing precipitation.
 Accessory clouds Not usually seen with stratus.
 Genitus mother clouds and other mother sources
 Stratus nimbostratogenitus
 Stratus cumulogenitus
 Stratus cumulonimbogenitus
 Stratus cataractagenitus Generated by the spray from waterfalls.
 Stratus silvagenitus A stratus cloud that forms as water vapor is added to the air above a forest.
 Stratus homogenitus
 Mutatus mother cloud
 Stratus stratocumulomutatus

Tropospheric cloud types with Latin etymologies where applicable
Cloud types are sorted in alphabetical order except where noted.

WMO genera
 Altocumulus (altus and cumulus) Latin for "high heap":  Applied to mid-level stratocumuliform.
 Altostratus (altus and stratus) "High sheet": Applied to mid-level stratiform.
 Cirrocumulus (cirrus and cumulus) "Hair-like heap": Applied to high-level stratocumuliform.
 Cirrostratus (cirrus and stratus) "Hair-like sheet": Applied to high-level stratiform.
 Cirrus "Hair-like": Applied to high-level cirriform.
 Cumulonimbus (cumulus and nimbus) "Precipitation-bearing heap": Applied to vertical/multi-level cumulonimbiform.
 Cumulus "Heap": Applied to low-level and vertical/multi-level cumuliform.
 Nimbostratus (nimbus and stratus) "Precipitation-bearing sheet": Applied to multi-level stratiform with vertical extent that produces precipitation of significant intensity.
 Stratocumulus (stratus and cumulus) "Sheet-like heap": Applied to low-level stratocumuliform.
 Stratus "Sheet": Applied to low-level mostly shallow stratiform.

WMO species
 Castellanus (Cas) Latin for "castle-like": Applies to stratocumuliform (Sc cas, Ac cas, Cc cas) and dense cirriform (Ci cas) with a series of turret shapes – indicates air mass instability.
 Congestus (Con) Latin for "congested": Applies to cumuliform (Cu con/Tcu) with great vertical development and heaped into cauliflower shapes – indicates considerable airmass instability and strong upcurrents.
 Fibratus (Fib) "Fibrous": Cirriform (Ci fib) or high stratiform (Cs fib) in the form of filaments, can be straight or slightly curved; indicates strong, continuous upper winds.
 Floccus (Flo) "Tufted": Applies to stratocumuliform (Sc flo, Ac flo, Cc flo) and high cirriform (Ci flo); indicates some mid or high-level instability.
 Fractus (Fra) "Broken": Low stratiform (St fra) or cumuliform (Cu fra) with an irregular shredded appearance – forms in precipitation and/or gusty winds.
 Humilis (Hum) "Small": Applies to cumuliform (Cu hum) with little vertical extent; indicates relatively slight airmass instability.
 Lenticularis (Len) "Lens–like": Stratocumuliform (Sc len, Ac len, Cc len) having a lens-like appearance – formed by standing waves of wind passing over mountains or hills.

 Mediocris (Med) "Medium-size": Cumuliform (Cu med) with moderate vertical extent; indicates moderate instability and upcurrents.
 Nebulosus (Neb) "Nebulous": Indistinct low and high stratiform (St neb, Cs  neb) without features; indicates light wind if any and stable air mass.
 Spissatus (Spi) "Dense": Thick cirriform (Ci spi) with a grey appearance; indicates some upward movement of air in the upper troposphere.
 Stratiformis (Str) "Sheet-like": Horizontal cloud sheet of flattened stratocumuliform (Sc str, Ac str, Cc str); indicates very slight airmass instability.
 Uncinus (Unc) "Hook-like": Cirriform (Ci unc) with a hook shape at the top; indicates a nearby backside of a weather system.
 Volutus (Vol) "Rolled":  Elongated, low or mid-level, tube shaped, stratocumuliform (Sc vol, Ac vol).

The division of genus types into species is as shown in the following table. The genus types (including some cumulus sub-types) are arranged from top to bottom in the left column in approximate descending order of average overall altitude range.  The species are sorted from left to right in approximate ascending order of instability or vertical extent of the forms to which each belongs:
 Stratiform species, 
 Cirriform species,
 Stratocumuliform species,
 Cumuliform species,
 Cumulonimbiform species.

These ordinal instability numbers appear in each box where a particular genus has a particular species.

WMO varieties
 Opacity-based
 Opacus Latin for "Opaque". A thick sheet of stratiform or stratocumuliform cloud.
 Perlucidus "Semi-transparent". Sheet of stratocumuliform cloud with small spaces between elements.
 Translucidus "Translucent". Thin translucent patch or sheet of stratiform or stratocumuliform.
 Pattern-based
 Duplicatus Latin for "Double". Closely spaced often partly merged layers of cloud in one of several possible forms.
 Intortus "Twisted". Curved and tangled cirriform.
 Lacunosus "Full of holes". Thin stratocumuliform cloud distinguished by holes and ragged edges.
 Radiatus "Radial". Clouds in one of several possible forms arranged in parallel lines that appear to converge at a central point near the horizon.
 Undulatus "Wavy". Stratiform or stratocumuliform cloud displaying an undulating pattern.
 Vertebratus "In the form of a back-bone". Cirriform arranged to look like the back-bone of a vertebrate.

The following table shows the cloud varieties arranged across the top of the chart from left to right in approximate descending order of frequency of appearance.  The genus types and some sub-types associated with each variety are sorted in the left column from top to bottom in approximate descending order of average overall altitude range.  Where applicable, the genera and varieties are cross-classified to show the species normally associated with each combination of genus and variety. The exceptions comprise the following: Altostratus that have varieties but no species so the applicable boxes are marked without specific species names; cumulus congestus, a species that has its own altitude characteristic but no varieties; cumulonimbus that have species but no varieties, and nimbostratus that has no species or varieties.  The boxes for genus and species combinations that have no varieties are left blank.

WMO supplementary features
 Precipitation-based supplementary features
 Praecipitatio Latin for "falling": Cloud whose precipitation reaches the ground.

 Virga "Twig" or "branch": Cloud whose precipitation evaporates before reaching the ground.

 Cloud-based supplementary features
 Arcus Latin for "arch" or "bow": Feature mostly attached to cumulus, thick with ragged edges.

 Asperitas "Roughness": A highly disturbed and chaotic wave feature occasionally seen with a stratocumulus or altocumulus cloud.

 Cavum "Hole": Supercooled altocumulus or cirrocumulus distinguished by a hole with ragged edges and virga or wisps of cirrus.

 Cauda "Tail": A tail cloud that extends horizontally away from the murus cloud and is the result of air feeding into the storm.

 Fluctus Crested wave-like stratocumulus, altocumulus, or cirrus cloud formed by wind-shear.

 Incus "Anvil": Top part of a mature cumulonimbus cloud; anvil-shaped feature.

 Mammatus WMO term mamma: "Breast": A feature in the form of round pouches on under-surface of a cloud.

 Murus "Wall": Cumulonimbus wall cloud with a lowering rotating base that can portend tornadoes.

 Tuba "Funnel" or "tube": Feature in the form of a column hanging from the bottom of cumulus or cumulonimbus.

 Accessory clouds
 Pannus Latin for "shredded cloth": A ragged or shredded accessory cloud that forms in precipitation below the main cloud.

 Pileus "Capped": A hood-shaped accessory cloud.

 Velum "A ship's sail": An accessory cloud in the form of a sail.

The supplementary features are associated with particular genera as follows. They are sorted from left to right in approximate decreasing order of frequency of occurrence for each of three categories.  The genus types and some sub-types are arranged from top to bottom in approximate descending order of average overall altitude range.  Each box is marked where a particular genus or sub-type has a particular supplementary feature.

Genitus mother clouds

 Altocumulogenitus Formed by the partial transformation of altocumulus mother cloud.
 Altostratogenitus Formed by the partial transformation of altostratus.
 Cirrogenitus Partial transformation of cirrus.
 Cirrocumulogenitus Partial transformation of cirrocumulus.
 Cirrostratogenitus Partial transformation of cirrostratus.
 Cumulogenitus Spreading out or partial transformation of cumulus.
 Cumulonimbogenitus Spreading out or partial transformation of cumulonimbus.
 Nimbostratogenitus Partial transformation of nimbostratus.
 Stratogenitus Partial transformation of stratus.
 Stratocumulogenitus Partial transformation of stratocumulus.

Other genitus clouds

 Cataractagenitus (cataracta-/pertaining to a river cataract) Formed from the mist at a waterfall, the downdraft caused from the cloud is counteracted by the ascending air displacement from the waterfall and may go on to form other types of clouds such as cumulus cataractagenitus.
 Flammagenitus (flamma-/pertaining to fire) Formed by convection associated with large wildfires.
 Homogenitus (homo-/pertaining to humans) Formed as a result of human activities, particularly aircraft at high altitudes and heat-generating industrial activities at surface level.  If a homogenitus cloud of one genus changes to another genus type, it is then termed a homomutatus cloud.
 Silvagenitus (silva-/pertaining to trees or forests) Formed by low-level condensation of water vapor released by vegetation, especially forest canopies.

Mutatus mother clouds
Nomenclature works the same way as for genitus mother clouds except for the mutatus suffix to indicate the complete rather than the partial transformation of the original cloud type. e.g. Altocumulomutatus – formed by the complete transformation of altocumulus mother cloud.
 
The possible combinations of genera and mother clouds can be seen in this table. The genitus and mutatus clouds are each sorted from left to right in alphabetical order.  The genus types and some sub-types are arranged from top to bottom in approximate descending order of average overall altitude range.  Each box is marked where a particular genus or sub-type has a particular genitus or  mutatus mother cloud.

Informal terms recently accepted for WMO classification with Latin nomenclature

 Aviaticus cloud Persistent condensation trails (contrails) formed by ice crystals originating from water vapor emitted by aircraft engines.  Usually resembles cirrus; recognized as a WMO genitus cloud cirrus homogenitus (man-made). Further transformation into cirrus, cirrocumulus, or cirrostratus homomutatus is possible depending on atmospheric stability and wind shear.  
 Fallstreak hole Supercooled altocumulus or cirrocumulus distinguished by a hole with ragged edges and virga or wisps of cirrus. Accepted as a WMO supplementary feature to be named cavum (hole).
 Kelvin–Helmholtz cloud Crested wave-like clouds formed by wind-shear instability that may occur at any altitude in the troposphere.  Accepted as a WMO supplementary feature with the Latin name fluctus.
  Pyrocumulus and Pyrocumulonimbus Cumulus and cumulonimbus clouds formed by quickly generated ground heat; including forest fires, volcanic eruptions and low level nuclear detonation. Accepted as a WMO genitus cloud with the Latin name flammagenitus, or homogenitus in the case of small cumulus formed by contained human activity.
 Roll cloud Elongated, low-level, tube shaped, horizontal formation not associated with a parent cloud.  Accepted as a WMO stratocumulus or altocumulus species with the Latin name volutus.

WMO and informal terms related to free-convective cloud types and storms
Accessory cloud (WMO supplementary feature) – secondary cloud that is associated with but separate from a main cloud.
Anvil (WMO supplementary feature incus) – the anvil top of a cumulonimbus cloud.
Anvil dome (WMO supplementary feature incus) – the overshooting top on a Cb that is often present on a supercell.
Anvil rollover – (slang) circular protrusion attached to underside of anvil.

Arcus cloud (WMO supplementary feature) – arch or a bow shape, attached to cumulus, thick with ragged edges.
Backsheared anvil – (slang) anvil that spreads upwind, indicative of extreme weather.
Clear slot or dry slot (informal term) – an evaporation of clouds as a rear flank downdraft descends and dries out cloud and occludes around a mesocyclone.
Cloud tags (WMO species fractus) – ragged detached portions of cloud.
Collar cloud (WMO velum accessory cloud) – ring shape surrounding upper part of wall cloud.
Condensation funnel (WMO supplementary feature tuba) – the cloud of a funnel cloud aloft or a tornado.
Altocumulus castellanus (WMO genus and species) – castle crenellation-shaped altocumulus clouds.
Cumulus (WMO genus) – heaped clouds.
Cumulus castellanus – (informal variation of WMO genus and species cumulus congestus) cumulus with tops shaped like castle crenellations.
Cumulus congestus (WMO genus and species) – considerable vertical development and heaped into cauliflower shapes.
Cumulus fractus (WMO genus and species) – ragged detached portions of cumulus cloud.
Cumulus humilis (WMO genus and species) – small, low, flattened cumulus, early development.
Cumulus mediocris (WMO genus and species) – medium-sized cumulus with bulges at the top.
Cumulus pileus (WMO genus and accessory cloud) – capped, hood-shaped cumulus cloud.
Cumulus praecipitatio (WMO genus and supplementary feature) – cumulus whose precipitation reaches the ground.
Cumulus radiatus (WMO genus and variety) – cumulus arranged in parallel lines that appear to converge near the horizon.

Cumulus tuba (WMO genus and supplementary feature) – column hanging from the bottom of cumulus.
Cumulonimbus (WMO genus) – heaped towering rain-bearing clouds that stretch to the upper levels of the troposphere.
Cumulonimbus calvus (WMO genus and species) – cumulonimbus with round tops like cumulus congestus.
Cumulonimbus capillatus (WMO genus and species) – Cb with cirriform top.
Cumulonimbus incus (WMO genus and supplementary feature) – Cb capillatus with anvil top.
Cumulonimbus mamma (WMO genus and supplementary feature) – Cb with pouch-like protrusions that hang from under anvil or cloud base.
Cumulonimbus pannus (WMO genus and accessory cloud) – shredded sections attached to main Cb cloud.
Cumulonimbus pileus (WMO genus and accessory cloud) – capped, hood-shaped cloud above a cumulonimbus cloud.
Cumulonimbus praecipitatio (WMO genus and supplementary feature) – Cb whose precipitation reaches the ground.
Cumulonimbus tuba (WMO genus and supplementary feature) – column hanging from the bottom of cumulonimbus.
Debris cloud (informal term) – rotating "cloud" of debris found at base of tornado.
Funnel cloud (WMO supplementary feature tuba) – rotating funnel of cloud hanging from under Cb, not making contact with ground.
Hail fog (informal term) – a shallow surface layer of fog that sometimes forms in vicinity of deep hail accumulation, can be very dense.
Hot tower (informal term) – a tropical cumulonimbus cloud that penetrates the tropopause.
Inflow band (informal term) – a laminar band marking inflow to a Cb, can occur at lower or mid levels of the cloud.
Inverted cumulus (informal variation of WMO supplementary feature mamma) – cumulus which has transferred momentum from an exceptionally intense Cb tower and is convectively growing on the underside of an anvil.
Knuckles (informal variation of WMO supplementary feature mamma) – lumpy protrusion that hangs from edge or underside of anvil.
Pyrocumulus and Pyrocumulonimbus– intense ground-heat cloud proposed for WMO classification (see above).
Rope – (slang) narrow, sometimes twisted funnel type cloud seen after a tornado dissipates.
Rope cloud (informal term) – A narrow, long, elongated line of cumulus clouds that sometimes develop at the leading edge of an advancing cold front that is often visible in satellite imagery.
Scud cloud (informal term for WMO species fractus) – ragged detached portions of cloud that usually form in precipitation.
Shelf cloud (informal term for WMO supplementary feature arcus) – wedge-shaped cloud often attached to the underside of Cb.
Stratus fractus (WMO genus and species) – ragged detached portions of stratus cloud that usually form in precipitation (see also scud cloud).
Striations (informal term for WMO accessory cloud velum) – a groove or band of clouds encircling an updraft tower, indicative of rotation.
Tail cloud (informal term) – an area of condensation consisting of laminar band and cloud tags extending from a wall cloud towards a precipitation core.
Towering cumulus (TCu) -aviation term for WMO genus and species cumulus congestus, a large cumulus cloud with great vertical development, usually with a cauliflower-like appearance, but lacking the characteristic anvil of a Cb.
Wall cloud (informal term) – distinctive fairly large lowering of the rain-free base of a Cb, often rotating.

Other planets

Venus
Thick overcast clouds of sulfur dioxide and carbon dioxide in three main layers at altitudes of 45 to 65 km that obscure the planet's surface and can produce virga.

 Stratiform Overcast opaque clouds sheets.
 Stratocumuliform Wave clouds with clear gaps through which lower stratiform layers may be seen.
 Cumuliform and cumulonimbiform Embedded convective cells that can produce lightning.

Mars
Clouds resembling several terrestrial types can be seen over Mars and are believed to be composed of water-ice.

 Extremely high cirriform Noctilucent clouds are known to form near the poles at altitudes similar to or higher than the same type of clouds over Earth.
 High cirriform Thin scattered wispy cloud resembling cirrus through which the planet's surface can be seen.
 High stratocumuliform Thin scattered wave-cloud resembling cirrocumulus.
 Low stratocumuliform Wave-cloud resembling stratocumulus, especially as a polar cap cloud over the winter pole which is mostly composed of suspended frozen carbon dioxide.
 Surface-based Morning fog of water and/or carbon dioxide commonly forms in low areas of the planet.

Jupiter and Saturn
Cloud decks in parallel latitudinal bands at and below the tropopause alternately composed of ammonia crystals and ammonium hydrosulfate.

 Cirriform Bands of cloud resembling cirrus located mainly in the highest of three main layers that cover Jupiter.
 Stratiform and stratocumuliform Wave and haze clouds that are seen mostly in the middle layer.
 Cumuliform and cumulonimbiform Convective clouds in the lowest layer that are capable of producing thunderstorms and may be composed at least partly of water droplets. an intermediate deck of ammonium hydrosulfide, and an inner deck of cumulus water clouds.

Uranus and Neptune
Cloud layers composed mainly of methane gas.

 Cirriform High wispy formations resembling cirrus.
 Stratiform Layers of haze-cloud that lack any distinct features.
 Cumuliform and cumulonimbiform Lower-based convective clouds that can produce thunderstorms.

See also
 Cloud species

Notes and references

External links
Introduction to Clouds (National Weather Service)
Ten Basic Cloud Types (National Weather Service)
International Cloud Atlas online (Archived)
Cloud Appreciation Society
Texas A&M Cloud Glossary
Cloud-identification site
UK Met Office cloud classification page
Cloud Atlas (Atlas Chmur) (in Polish)
NOAA

 
Satellite interpretation

lv:Mākoņu veidu uzskaitījums
pl:Chmura#Klasyfikacja chmur